Vladimir Viktorovich Gudev (17 September 1940 – 6 January 2022) was a Russian diplomat. He served as Ambassador from the Soviet Union and later Russia to Iran from 1987 to 1993, Ambassador to Egypt from 1995 to 2000, and Ambassador to Georgia from 2000 to 2002. He died on 6 January 2022, at the age of 81.

References

1940 births
2022 deaths
Diplomats from Moscow
Ambassador Extraordinary and Plenipotentiary (Soviet Union)
Ambassadors of Russia to Iran
Ambassadors of the Soviet Union to Iran
Ambassadors of Russia to Egypt
Ambassadors of Russia to Georgia (country)
Moscow State Institute of International Relations alumni